Simmaco is an Italian surname of Roman origin.

History 
The family was one of the most prominent Plebeian families during late antiquity, producing several consuls, plebeian tribunes, provincial governors, urban prefects (or "mayors" of the city of Rome), and scholarly men of letters. Despite being most notable for their defense of Roman polytheism and traditional Roman culture (especially by Quintus Aurelius Symmachus) during the Theodosian persecution of paganism, the family also had several distinguished Christian members during the Ante-Nicene Period, including an early pope, Symmachus. The Christian philosopher Boethius was adopted into the family as a child, and named his son Symmachus in their honor.

Being at the centre of the many political trials and tribulations both before and after the sack of Rome, the family declined significantly. Several members were executed for their political allegiances and religious beliefs, especially by the Goths and Vandals.

Demographics 
As of 2015 it is one of the rarest surnames in the world, with only about 60 carriers.

People 
Maurizio Simmaco, Professor of Biochemical Sciences at Sapienza University of Rome, and Director of the Advanced Molecular Diagnostics laboratory at the Ospedale Sant'Andrea hospital in Rome, Italy.

References 

Surnames
Ancient Roman nomina